205th Division or 205th Infantry Division may refer to:

 205th Division (1st Formation)(People's Republic of China), 1949–1950
 205th Infantry Division (German Empire)
 205th Infantry Division (Wehrmacht)
 Italian 205th Coastal Division
 205th Division (Imperial Japanese Army)
 205th Motorized Infantry Brigade (People's Republic of China)